Krasnosulinsky (masculine), Krasnosulinskaya (feminine), or Krasnosulinskoye (neuter) may refer to:
Krasnosulinsky District, a district of Rostov Oblast, Russia
Krasnosulinskoye Urban Settlement, an administrative division and a municipal formation which the town of Krasny Sulin in Krasnosulinsky District of Rostov Oblast, Russia is incorporated as